The Corallinoideae are a subfamily of coralline algae.  All its genera are geniculate.

References

Bikont subfamilies
Corallinaceae